Idharkuthane Aasaipattai Balakumara, also referred to as Idhaaba or more commonly as Balakumara, is a 2013 Indian Tamil-language comedy film, written and directed by Gokul. Produced by Leo Visions, the film stars Vijay Sethupathi, Ashwin, Swati, Nandita, and Pasupathy. The film upon release received highly positive reviews from critics. The film got remade into Kannada language as Jackson starring Duniya Vijay in the lead. The title of the film was inspired by a line in Thanga Padhumai. The film released on 2 October 2013.

Plot
Kumaravel (Vijay Sethupathi) is a typical lower middle class youth who mainly lives in TASMAC bars. His friends and neighbors have nicknamed him Sumaar Moonji Kumar (average-looking Kumar) alias SMK, and he is stalking Kumudha (Nandita), the girl staying opposite to his flat. It is a one-way love. Kumudha's father (Pattimandram Raja) has sought the help of Annachi (Pasupathy), the local boss, to find a solution and teach SMK a lesson. On a parallel track, another alcoholic named Balakrishnan (Ashwin) is a smart bank salesperson but is always under pressure from his boss Poochandi (M. S. Bhaskar) and possessive girlfriend Renu (Swathi). One night, the life of the principal characters gets entangled, leading to the climax.

Cast

 Vijay Sethupathi as Kumaravel aka Sumaar Moonji Kumar (SMK)
 Ashwin as Balakrishnan aka Bala
 Nandita as Kumudha, Kumar's Lover
 Swati as Renu, Bala's Lover
 Selma Edith as Aparna
 Pasupathy as Annachi
 Soori as Thambi
 Daniel Pope as Romba Sumaar Moonji Kumar (RSMK), Kumar's best friend
 Pattimandram Raja as Kumudha's father
 Bhargavi Radha as Kumudha's mother
 M. S. Bhaskar as Balakrishnan's boss
 Livingston as Sammandham, Kumar's father
 Vinodh Munna as Patti Babu
 Rajendran as Painter Rajendran aka Raj
 Madhumitha as Baby
 Robo Shankar as Sound Shankar
 Siddharth Vipin as Akilesh
 Thakkali as Shanmugam
 Mahanadhi Shankar as a police officer
 Senthi Kumari as a pregnant lady 
 Sai Priyanka Ruth as Renu's friend
 Raju Sundaram (special appearance in the song "En Veetula")
 Johnny (special appearance in the song "En Veetula")
 Nobel Paul (special appearance in the song "En Veetula").
 V. S. Raghavan (special appearance in the song "Prayer Song")

Production
The film was said to be based on the daily comical things that happen in our day-to-day life. Siddharth Vipin, who did the background score for Naduvula Konjam Pakkatha Kaanom, was chosen to do the music for the film. Soori was playing an important role and Madhan Karky penned the dialogues for this film. Pasupathy was selected to play an important role in this film. The latest to join was Ashwin Kakumanu, who made his debut in Mankatha. The film's pooja was held on 11 March 2013. The title of the film was inspired by a line in Thanga Padhumai.

Marketing
On 12 August 2013, a song from the film called "Prayer song" was released as a single. The single track was an instant hit garnering lakhs of views.

Soundtrack

The soundtrack album was composed by Siddharth Vipin who earlier composed background score for Naduvula Konjam Pakkatha Kaanom and this is his full-fledged debut as music composer. The lyrics were penned by Madhan Karky and Lalithanand. The single, 'Prayer Song' was released on 12 August 2013. The complete album was released on 30 August 2013 at Sathyam Cinemas. The album was released by Jiiva in the presence of director Balaji Sakthivel and received by the film cast. The single was believed to have been inspired by Jaron and the Long Road to Love's Pray for You which Madhan Karky denied, concluding that both songs only had the same concept. The chorus of the song "En Veetula" samples the Jab Pyar Kisi Se Hota Hai song "Sau Saal Pehle".

The album consists of three tracks composed by Siddharth Vipin and an additional track by Ved Shankar.

Release
Idharkuthane Aasaipattai Balakumara released on 2 October 2013 coinciding with Gandhi Jayanthi in 300+ screens worldwide.

Box office
The film raked 100% occupancy on first day, collecting  which is the biggest opening for Vijay Sethupathi. The film collected   at the box office and declared as a box-office success.

Critical reception
The film received very positive reviews from critics with most critics praising Vijay Sethupathi's performance.

The Times of India gave 3.5 out of 5 stars and wrote Idharkuthaane Aasaipattai Balakumara lacks the sophistication of a Soodhu Kavvum or Pizza but makes up for it in sheer likeability. His debut Rowthiram was an uneven effort but in Idhaaba, Gokul is more sure-footed, deftly weaving plotlines and confidently untying the knots in his script". IANS gave 3.5 out of 5 and wrote Idharkuthane Aasaipattai Balakumara (IAB) doesn't merely entertain, but also addresses a domestic issue with a very strong dose of humour. It's undoubtedly one of the smartest yet funniest Tamil films in recent times. Behindwoods gave 3.25 stars and stated "Idharkuthaane Aasaipattai Balakumara is not an adhesive that keeps you glued on the seat, but is a spring that might make you bounce with laughter". The critics from Sify.com mentioned "Idharkuthane Aasaipattai Balakumara (IAB) is a good fun ride. It is a comedy film laced with black humour and works due to its smart writing." Rediff gave 3 out of 5 stars, wrote "Director Gokul in his film, Idharkuthane Aasaipattai Balakumara has created some weird, quirky and offbeat characters in hilarious situations who keep the audience entertained, writes" and called it a "laugh riot". Oneindia gave 3 out of 5 stars and wrote "Director Gokul has done a good job in making the film a worth entertainer. His screenplay, though has jerks at parts, is good and the introductory scene gets a special mention" and called the film "a one time watchable movie".

In contrast, Baradwaj Rangan from The Hindu wrote "Gokul's Idharkuthane Aasaipattai Balakumara isn't a lazy movie. It is, in fact, the opposite. There's too much of everything – too much plot, too much mood, with three narrative strands infused with three unique sensibilities. He concluded that the film provided "Some mild laughs" and "Lots of tedium".

Legacy 
The character of Sumar Moonji Kumar inspired a song titled "Sumar Moonji Kumaru" in Bruce Lee (2017). A spin-off titled Corona Kumar is in the works.

References

External links
 

Films shot in Kobe
Indian romantic comedy films
2013 romantic comedy films
Films scored by Ved Shankar
2013 films
2010s Tamil-language films
Films scored by Siddharth Vipin
Tamil films remade in other languages
Indian nonlinear narrative films
Films shot in Osaka Prefecture
Films shot in Osaka